František Paďour (born 19 January 1988) is a Czech road bicycle racer, who last rode for UCI Professional Continental team .

Padour left  at the end of the 2013 season, and joined  for the 2014 season.

Major results

2006
 1st  Road race, National Junior Road Championships
 7th Overall Giro della Lunigiana
2007
 2nd Road race, National Under-23 Road Championships
 3rd Overall Vysočina Tour
 3rd Overall Haná Tour
2008
 2nd Overall Soběslav Tour
 7th GP Betonexpressz 2000
2009
 1st  Overall Vysočina Tour
1st Stage 2
 1st  Overall Lidice Tour
 9th Grand Prix Kooperativa
2012
 1st  Overall Czech Cycling Tour
1st Stage 1 (TTT)
 8th Tour Bohemia
2013
 8th Grand Prix Královéhradeckého kraje
 9th Overall Okolo Jižních Čech
2014
 5th Overall Tour of Qinghai Lake

References

External links

1988 births
Living people
Czech male cyclists
Sportspeople from Prague